Dockers' Union may refer to:

 Dock, Wharf, Riverside and General Labourers' Union (1887–1922)
 National Union of Dock Labourers (1889–1922)
 Scottish Union of Dock Labourers (1911–1922)
 Transport and General Workers' Union (1922–2007)